Oenomel, derived from the Greek words oinos (wine) and meli (honey), is an ancient Greek beverage consisting of honey and unfermented grape juice. It is sometimes used as a folk remedy for gout and certain nervous disorders.

Many drinks are prepared using honey. Mead is a fermented alcoholic beverage made of honey, water, and yeast. Oxymel is made of honey, vinegar, sea salt, and rain-water. Hydromel consists of simply honey and water. Rhodomel is a mixture of roses and honey. Omphacomel is made from fermented grape juice and honey. Oenomel comes from unfermented grape juice and honey.

Oenomel has the connotation of being a blend of strength and sweetness, which can mean something positive (as in a personality trait) or negative (as in a carrot-and-stick approach).

References

Historical drinks
Honey-based beverages